"Peaches en Regalia" is an instrumental jazz fusion composition by Frank Zappa. It was released on Zappa's album Hot Rats in 1969 and has been recorded many times since. It was also released as a single in 1970, with "Little Umbrellas" as the B-side. Zappa used the piece on many of his tours, often as either the opening or the encore of a show.

"Peaches en Regalia" has been included in the "underground" version of The Real Book, despite being compositionally more complicated than typical jam session tunes. Having a song included in the book has been described as "the ultimate insider credential for a jazz composer".

The tune is used as instrumental background music on the BBC London radio programme presented by Danny Baker, as well as the Elis James and John Robins show on BBC Radio 5 Live. It was also the theme tune for the early 1970s BBC2 show One Man's Week.

A cover of the piece, recorded by Zappa Plays Zappa (including Zappa's son Dweezil and former Zappa alumni Steve Vai and Napoleon Murphy Brock), won a Grammy Award for Best Rock Instrumental Performance in February 2009.

Personnel
Frank Zappa – octave bass, guitar, percussion
Ian Underwood – keyboards, flute, saxophone, clarinet
Shuggie Otis – bass
Ron Selico – drums

Renditions

By Zappa

On tribute albums

Other versions

Legacy
Don Miguel Vilanova (aka Botafogo), an Argentine blues musician, had a band in the late 1980s, inspired by the blues and specifically Zappa's song "Peaches en Regalia", the name of which was  translated literally into the Spanish as "Durazno de Gala".

Notes

External links
 

1969 compositions
Grammy Award for Best Rock Instrumental Performance
Compositions by Frank Zappa
Frank Zappa songs
Jazz fusion compositions
Song recordings produced by Frank Zappa